Bombus lapponicus is a species of bumblebee. It is native to northern Europe, where it occurs in Finland, Norway, Sweden, and Russia.

This is generally a common bee. The species' exact range is unclear because many collections are actually other bumblebee taxa.

This species lives in taiga and tundra. It feeds on a variety of plant taxa.

References

Bumblebees
Insects described in 1793
Hymenoptera of Europe